The Weser-Aller Plains and Geest  is a natural regional unit of the North German Plain in Germany. It extends over most of the southern catchment of the Aller including the lower reaches of the Oker and Leine and is bounded in the west by the Middle Weser.

It is also bounded, from a natural region perspective, by the Stade Geest, the Luneburg Heath, the Wendland and the Altmark in the north; in the east by the Central German Black Earth Region (Mitteldeutsches Schwarzerdegebiet), in the south by the Northern Harz Foreland and Lower Saxon Börde and, in the west, by the Dümmer-Geest Lowland and Ems-Hunte Geest. In the BfN numbering scheme it is number D31.

Natural regional allocation 
In the system of natural regions of Germany the Weser-Aller Plains are a tertiary level major region and major unit group (Number 62, two-digit) within the North German Plain (primary level major region). They are split as into the following major units (fourth level regions, three-digits) :

 62 Weser-Aller Plains (D31)
 620 Verden Weser Valley
 621 Thedinghäusen Foregeest
 622 Hanoverian Moor Geest
 623 Burgdorf-Peine Geest
 624 East Brunswick Plain
 625 Drömling
 626 Upper Aller Valley
 627 Aller Valley Sand Plain
 628 Loccum Geest

References

Literature 
 

Geography of Lower Saxony
North German Plain
Regions of Lower Saxony